Hariprriya is an Indian actress and model who mostly works in Kannada films, in addition to a few Tamil and Telugu films. She gained wide acclaim for her role in Ugramm which fetched her a lot of appreciation and awards and also for her performances in Ranna, Ricky, Neerdose, Bharjari, Samhaara, Jai Simha, Bell Bottom, Soojidara and D/O Parvathamma.

Films

Television

Music videos

See also 
 List of Indian film actresses

Footnotes

References

External links
 

Actress filmographies
Indian filmographies